Billy Taylor (born 11 January 1977) is an English cricket umpire who was previously professional cricketer.

He started playing for Hampshire during the 2004 season, before which he played for Sussex. While at Sussex, he had won the Frizzell County Championship in 2003, their first season victory in the trophy's history. He received a county cap for Hampshire in 2006.

Taylor, who also played for Wiltshire, has three hat-tricks to his name and was listed in the 2005 C&G Trophy-winning Hampshire squad. He achieved one of his hat tricks during a Hampshire v Middlesex game and a career best of 6 for 32, this was the first hat trick at the Rose Bowl. 

Hampshire chairman Rod Bransgrove announced on 27 August 2009 that the club had released Taylor, ending his five-year tenure at the club. In 2011, he was added to the England and Wales Cricket Board list of reserve umpires, alongside Russell Evans and Alex Wharf. In 2016 Billy was appointed to the ECB's Full Umpires List.

His brother, James, has also played List A and Minor Counties cricket for Wiltshire.

References

External links

1977 births
Living people
Cricketers from Southampton
English cricketers
Sussex cricketers
Hampshire cricketers
Wiltshire cricketers
English cricket umpires